Lee Jang-Moo (Korean: 이장무, Hanja: 李長茂, born May 14, 1945) is a professor of Seoul National University in the department of Mechanical Engineering and the current president of Seoul National University since July 2006.

References

Living people
1945 births
Seoul National University alumni
Iowa State University alumni
Academic staff of Seoul National University
Presidents of Seoul National University
Members of the National Academy of Sciences of the Republic of Korea